Benedicto "Magnum" L. Membrere III (born July 20, 1982 in Pangasinan) is a Filipino former professional basketball player in the Philippine Basketball Association who is former team manager for TNT Tropang Giga. He was drafted nineteenth overall by Red Bull in 2006 and played there for 4 seasons. He also had a brief stint as an assistant coach for the Boosters, before returning to playing court as a member of the Talk 'N Text Tropang Texters.

External links
Player Profile

1982 births
Filipino men's basketball players
Living people
Basketball players from Pangasinan
Ateneo Blue Eagles men's basketball players
Point guards
Barako Bull Energy Boosters players
Barako Bull Energy Boosters draft picks